Ludza Municipality is a municipality in Latgale, Latvia. The municipality was formed in 2009 by merging Briģi Parish, Cirma Parish, Isnauda Parish, Istra Parish, Nirza Parish, Ņukši Parish, Pilda Parish, Pureņi Parish, Rundēni Parish and Ludza town, the administrative centre being Ludza.

During the 2021 Latvian administrative reform, the previous municipality was merged with Cibla Municipality, Kārsava Municipality and Zilupe Municipality. The new municipality now fully corresponds with the area of the former Ludza District.

The municipality is located 267 km from the capital of Latvia - Riga, by the Latvian-Russian border, i.e. by the border of the European Union with the Russian Federation.

The territory of the municipality is crossed by the internationally important Riga-Moscow road and by the Riga-Moscow railway.

Population

Images

See also 
 Administrative divisions of Latvia
 Ludza
Ludza dialect

References 

 
Municipalities of Latvia
Latgale